The Gift is the thirteenth studio album by American rapper Master P. The album was released on December 6, 2013, by No Limit Forever and XLP Distribution. It became his first release in 8 years.  The album features guest appearances from Howie T, AD, Alley Boy, Rick Ross, Silkk the Shocker, Cymphonique, Romeo, Jeremih, Yo Gotti, Krazy, Deezle, Play Beezy, Gangsta, Miss Chee, Larayne, T-Bo, The Game and Nipsey Hussle. The album was supported with the official singles "Two Three" and "Lonely Road".

Background
In October 2013, during an interview with AllHipHop, Master P stated that each copy of The Gift would come with a “golden lottery ticket", which would put the purchaser in a raffle for $10,000 dollars, saying: "As I get better with time, the man upstairs has blessed me and continues to give me the inspiration to share my talents or should I say my GIFT with my current and new fan base of music consumers of all ages and ethnic backgrounds across the world. With the holidays approaching and the economy being the way it is, many families will be unable to buy gifts for their loved ones and that’s why I want to give everyone THE GIFT. Most importantly, I will be able to use my gift of music to help give back to underprivileged kids in many communities, and give them a chance to receive Christmas gifts that they would normally not be able to afford. It is my hope that this will encourage other artists to join me in this movement."

Singles
On November 20, 2013, the album's first single "Two Three" featuring Rick Ross was released.

Track listing

Samples
"Holding Back the Years"  contains a sample of "Holding Back the Years"  performed by Simply Red

References

Master P albums
2013 albums
Albums produced by 1500 or Nothin'